This is a list of flags used in Austria. For more information about the national flag, visit the article Flag of Austria.

National and state flag

Standards

Personal standards of emperors

Austria under National Socialism

Military flags

Austro-Hungarian Armed Forces

Naval flags

Austro-Hungarian Navy

Police

State flags

Political  flags

Ethnic groups flags

Historical flags

Flag of subdivisions of Austria-Hungary

House flags of austrian freight companies

Yacht clubs of Austria 

Flags
Austria